Andreas Westh (born 22 May 1977) is a Swedish bandy sweeper who currently plays for Elitserien side Bollnäs GIF.

Career

Club career
Westh is a youth product of Bollnäs and has represented their senior team and Sandviken.

International career
Westh was part of Swedish World Champions teams of 2005, 2009, 2010, 2012, and 2017.

Honours

Country
 Sweden
 Bandy World Championship: 2005, 2009, 2010, 2012, 2017

References

External links
 
 

1977 births
Living people
Swedish bandy players
Bollnäs GIF players
Sandvikens AIK players
Sweden international bandy players
Bandy World Championship-winning players